Abramtsev (masculine) or Abramtseva (feminine) is a Russian last name. It derives from the patronymic "Abramtsev", which, in turn, is derived from "Abramets"—a diminutive of the Hebrew name Abraham (Abram).

Toponyms
Abramtseva, alternative name of the selo of Abramtsevo in Sinkovskoye Rural Settlement of Dmitrovsky District in Moscow Oblast
Abramtseva, alternative name of the village of Abramtsevo in Sinkovskoye Rural Settlement of Dmitrovsky District in Moscow Oblast

See also
Abramtsevo, several rural localities in Russia
Abramtsevo Colony, a museum estate in Moscow Oblast, Russia; a center of artistic activity in the 19th century

References

Notes

Sources
В. А. Никонов (V. A. Nikonov). "Словарь русских фамилий" (Dictionary of the Russian Last Names). Москва, 1993. .

Russian-language surnames
